Spiritbox is a Canadian heavy metal band from Victoria, British Columbia. Husband and wife duo guitarist Mike Stringer and vocalist Courtney LaPlante established Spiritbox in 2017. The band's full lineup comprises LaPlante, Stringer and drummer Zev Rose; former As I Lay Dying bassist Josh Gilbert currently performs live with the band. The band's metal style is difficult to pigeonhole into a specific metal music genre and displays an array of styles that draw from a variety of influences and incorporate electronic elements.

Dissatisfaction caused LaPlante and Stringer to leave their former band, Iwrestledabearonce, and they started Spiritbox, seeking artistic freedom. They released a debut extended play, Spiritbox (2017), followed by a second EP, Singles Collection (2019) with an expanded lineup. Rather than touring, Spiritbox initially developed an approach to fanbase building focused on the Internet and introduced their music through acclaimed music videos. The band began touring in 2020, and continued to gain popularity with several singles that reached the Billboard charts before releasing their debut album Eternal Blue (2021), which entered the US Billboard 200 at number 13. Their music is currently released through their label, Pale Chord, via a partnership with Rise Records.

History

2015–2019: Formation and early years 

Before co-founding Spiritbox, singer Courtney LaPlante and guitarist Mike Stringer were both in Iwrestledabearonce. The couple, engaged for four years, nevertheless wanted to form their joint musical project since 2011. In late 2015, they decided to quit the band. LaPlante and Stringer had each replaced a previous member of Iwrestledabearonce, and were never comfortable with that status in the band; the two also desired to pursue a new personal and creative direction. The couple decided to take a break from touring and return to their hometown to find regular employment. Throughout 2015, multi-instrumentalist Stringer presented to LaPlante demos of songs that he created diligently, displaying different musical styles. LaPlante and Stringer got married in 2016, and two weeks after the wedding, they began investing their money into recording the songs. Stringer wrote the drum parts for a planned extended play, which were rearranged by their session drummer at the time, former Iwrestledabearonce bandmate Mikey Montgomery. The EP was recorded by LaPlante and Stringer in their home studio, along with their friend Tim Creviston. It was mixed and mastered by Dan Braunstein in Los Angeles.

On October 9, 2017, the husband and wife duo announced the launch of their band named Spiritbox. Spiritbox formed in Victoria, located on Vancouver Island, British Columbia. LaPlante explained that Iwrestledabearonce had made no statement regarding their situation, and thus, she officially confirmed her departure from the band on October 25, 2017. Spiritbox ultimately received a budget from FACTOR (the Foundation to Assist Canadian Talent on Records), funded by the Government of Canada and private broadcasters, to support investments required for recording and touring. As Spiritbox, the couple released a seven-song self-titled debut EP on October 27, 2017, which followed a single, "The Beauty of Suffering". Soon afterward, the project was paused for some time, finding themselves deadlocked in their efforts to play the songs in live performances without other musicians.

In 2018, Bill Crook of the pop-punk band Living with Lions joined the band as the permanent bassist, expressing esteem for their music and offering support through friendship. Shortly after, they found a replacement drummer in Ryan Loerke, who also played in the Kelowna-based Shreddy Krueger. Jason Mageau, the former manager of Iwrestledabearonce, founded the Pale Chord label, which was distributed via The Orchard in order to release Spiritbox's music. Mageau (part of Roc Nation) and the band decided to promote and establish online music rather than spending money on small club tours. As a result, they opted not to tour for two years. While Spiritbox gained a growing fan base, they released a five-song EP titled Singles Collection on April 26, 2019, through Pale Chord. Throughout 2018 and 2019, the band composed most of the songs for their intended debut album.

2020–present: Eternal Blue 
Loerke left the band in 2020. They subsequently recruited Philadelphia-based drummer Zev Rose (full family name Rosenberg), who is considerably younger than the other members. The band's debut full-length album Eternal Blue was originally scheduled for released in 2020, but production was interrupted due to the COVID-19 pandemic. Spiritbox found critical and commercial success with the release of the single "Holy Roller" in July 2020. It debuted at No. 25 on Billboard Hot Hard Rock Songs. The song's original version spent seven weeks as No. 1 on Sirius XM Liquid Metal's Devil's Dozen, and was deemed the best song of 2020 by the station's listeners. In September 2020, Spiritbox announced that they had signed with Rise Records, as part of the label's partnership with Pale Chord. 

The band subsequently released a remix of "Holy Roller" in October, which featured Ryo Kinoshita of Crystal Lake.  The "Holy Roller" remix version spent five weeks as No. 2 on Sirius XM Liquid Metal's Devil's Dozen. In December 2020, Spiritbox debuted "Constance", a song about dementia that was dedicated to LaPlante's grandmother. In the same month, a Kerrang! magazine reader's poll voted Spiritbox as "Best New Band". The continued release of "super popular" music videos created anticipation for Spiritbox's forthcoming album.

In January 2021, Revolver included Spiritbox's upcoming release in its list of "60 Most Anticipated Albums of 2021." At this point, the band moved to Joshua Tree, California, to continue working on their debut album. The deadline of April 2021 was set to have the album release capacity in the same year. The third single from the album, "Circle with Me", was released in April. In May, LaPlante appeared on her first major magazine cover, the May issue of Kerrang!. later that month, the band released the single "Secret Garden", which landed in the Top 40 of the Billboard Mainstream Rock chart. In June 2021, as part of their Collection: Live series, the Grammy Museum asked Spiritbox to perform and record a live acoustic version of "Constance" in a church accompanied by a string ensemble. One final single, "Hurt You", was released in advance of the album in late August.

 
At the end of August 2021, the band's songs surpassed 80 million streams across all global streaming platforms, and all physical release and merchandising items were sold out. Reflecting on the anticipation for the album's release, it was described as the "most anticipated debut album of 2021" by Alternative Press, Kerrang!, and Metal Hammer. 

Nearing the release of Eternal Blue in mid-September 2021, LaPlante revealed that drummer Rose was an official member of Spiritbox. Since joining in early 2020, Rose had not been photographed with the band, leading to speculation that he was not an official member, though LaPlante explained that this was because of travel restrictions during the COVID-19 pandemic that prevented Rose from physically joining the band in Victoria. The band finally met Rose in-person two days before embarking on their.

Eternal Blue was released on September 17, 2021, to positive reviews from critics. LaPlante said she considered Eternal Blue as "finally, at age 32, the realization of my true voice". The album peaked at No. 13 on the US Billboard 200, and landed at No. 3 on the Top Album Sales chart in the week ending October 2, 2021. It topped on both Billboards Top Rock Albums and Hard Rock Albums charts. The album peaked at No. 8 on the ARIA Charts and No. 19 on the UK Albums Chart. According to Pollstar, Spiritbox's official merchandise store grossed $1 million from its opening in May 2020 to October 2021, with between $30,000 to $60,000 coming in per month.

On May 22, 2022, Spiritbox announced the departure of bassist Bill Crook, a mutual decision within the band. Spiritbox quickly recruited Josh Gilbert, who had recently left As I Lay Dying, as their temporary touring bassist. On June 22, 2022, the band released the three-song Rotoscope EP and a video for the title track "Rotoscope". Guitar World noted that the title track was a dance-like number, while the other two tracks "Sew Me Up" and "Hysteria" were "synth-flavored arrangements".

Musical style and influences

Spiritbox employs several heavy metal-based musical styles. Writing for Metal Injection, Max Morin wrote that attempting to pigeonhole the band to any particular music style is "pointless". Critics have described their style as metalcore, progressive metal, alternative metal, post-metal, djent, and nu metal. They have also been labelled as "post-metalcore". Bobby Olivier of Billboard wrote the band displayed aspects ranging from atmospheric to industrial. According to LaPlante, the band's music was constructed out of a progressive metal foundation before being condensed for the final version of the songs. Revolvers Eli Enis described the band's musical style as an arrangement of "alt-metal with elegant vocals and thunderous djent grooves". LaPlante herself has defined the musical genre of Spiritbox as metalcore; however, she also said that "My main goal with this band is fluidity".

The band integrates electronic elements such as samples and programmed drums within their sound as distinctive characteristics, as part of a musical genre evolving through the artistic use of new technologies. Guitar World wrote that Spiritbox "successfully mastered the art of digitally infused metal" while "maintaining a sonic stamp that's completely their own". The digital synthesizer appeared as a particular sonic aspect of the band. Spiritbox combined electronic styles after deriving inspiration from the 1980s pop music scene, Nine Inch Nails, and early post-punk bands such as the Cure. The band has acknowledged that the impact of 1980s dark rock and pop bands, embodied by uncluttered musical compositions through synthesizer minimalism in "airy" song structures, inspired Spiritbox's style and served as the backbone for their work.

Spiritbox has credited Alexisonfire and Protest the Hero as early musical influences. The band referred to Depeche Mode and Tears for Fears as particularly significant influences. Stringer's guitar playing style includes the "Gojira-esque pick scrape technique". LaPlante has cited Tesseract, Deftones, Kate Bush, and Tool as influences; and mentioned that Meshuggah was her "standard bearer" in heavy metal. She has also expressed admiration for Gojira, Björk, Beyoncé, and FKA Twigs.

LaPlante's first experience with the death growl came from listening to Cannibal Corpse at the age of five, which developed into a marked interest in harsh vocals during her early adolescence while listening to nu metal. At the age of eighteen, LaPlante laid down her screamed vocals for the first time on a breakdown of a song written by her brother. She said that it is necessary to push the boundaries of the metalcore genre by bringing modernity and diversity of vocal styles to stay relevant. Her vocal phrasing based on her musical expression, primarily rooted in contemporary R&B, would become a distinctive feature; she has cited Doja Cat, H.E.R., SZA, and the Weeknd as influences. LaPlante's singing has received acclaim from music critics. Morin called her "one of the best vocalists in the modern metal scene". Sam Coare of Kerrang! highlights her vocal performance saying that "Few frontpeople handle the transition from cleans to screams with the skill, depth and ferocity of Courtney LaPlante".

Touring 
The band embarked on their first tour in February 2020, supporting After the Burial in Europe, though it was canceled partway through due to the COVID-19 pandemic. Their second tour in July 2021, supporting Limp Bizkit in the US, was also canceled after a few dates due to safety concerns involving the pandemic. This aborted tour with Limp Bizkit led the band to many unexpected expenses. Shinedown singer Brent Smith offered Spiritbox $10,000 to help cover lost tour expenses, while We Came as Romans decided not to charge for the lighting package the band had rented from them. Smith said, "I felt horrible what happened and I would hate for this band to not be able to continue due to this and I just want to contribute." In October 2021, Spiritbox performed on the Coheed and Cambria-headlined S.S. Neverender cruise, produced by Norwegian Cruise Line partner Sixthman. In August 2021, Spiritbox was announced as one of the supporting bands on Underoath's Voyeurist tour, along with Bad Omens and Stray From The Path, in February and March 2022. Prior to losing Crook in May 2022, Ghost announced that Spiritbox would be guests alongside Mastodon as opening acts for the second North American leg of their Imperatour through August and September 2022.

In November 2022, Spiritbox announced their first ever headlining tour of the United States; they will be joined by After the Burial and Intervals from April to May 2023. On March 7, 2023, Falling In Reverse announced the Popular Monstour, a tour of the United States on which Spiritbox would perform as a guest at six shows. However, in the following days, Falling In Reverse frontman Ronnie Radke attracted controversy after a fan who alleged him of assault drew an aggressive response from Radke on Twitter. On March 13, Spiritbox announced from their own Twitter account that they had dropped off the dates they were scheduled for the tour.

Band members 

Current members
 Courtney LaPlante – vocals (2016–present)
 Mike Stringer – guitar (2016–present)
 Zev Rosenberg – drums (2020–present)

Touring members
 Josh Gilbert – bass, backing vocals (2022–present)

Former session members
 Mikey Montgomery – drums (2017)

Former members
 Ryan Loerke – drums (2018–2020)
 Bill Crook – bass (2018–2022)

Timeline

Discography

Albums

EPs

Singles

As featured artist

Music videos

Awards and nominations

Heavy Music Awards
The Heavy Music Awards is an annual awards ceremony in partnership with Amazon Music and Ticketmaster.

!
|-
!scope="row"| 2021
| Spiritbox
| Best International Breakthrough Band
| 
| style="text-align:center;"|
|}

Juno Award

!
|-
!scope="row" rowspan="2"| 2022
| Spiritbox
| Breakthrough Group of the Year
| 
| rowspan="2" style="text-align:center;"|
|-
| Eternal Blue
| Metal/Hard Music Album of the Year
| 
|}

Saskatchewan Independent Film Awards
The Saskatchewan Independent Film Awards is a ceremony presented annually by the Saskatchewan Filmpool Cooperative, honoring the province's independent film achievements.

!
|-
!scope="row"| 2021
| "Constance" 
| Best Music Video
| 
| style="text-align:center;"|
|}

Saskatchewan Music Awards
The Saskatchewan Music Awards is an annual awards ceremony established in 2018, honoring the achievements of the province's music industry.

!
|-
!scope="row"| 2020
| "Blessed Be" 
| Music Video of the Year
| 
| style="text-align:center;"|
|}

References

Footnotes

Citations

External links

 Official Website
 
 

Canadian heavy metal musical groups
Canadian metalcore musical groups
Female-fronted musical groups